Roman Evsey Glazman (June 26, 1948 – April 24, 2006) was a Russian American physicist and oceanographer.

Early life and education
Roman E. Glazman was born in St. Petersburg, Russia, on June 26, 1948, in a secular Jewish family.  He became a citizen of the United States on October 28, 1985 and completed his PhD in Ocean Engineering at the University of Rhode Island in 1985.

Career
Glazman's scientific research was the study of ocean and atmosphere. He began working at NASA's Jet Propulsion Laboratory in La Cañada Flintridge and Pasadena, California.

Glazman published more than 40 works in oceanography in scientific journals and completed over 60 research studies presenting at International Scientific Conferences, including OCEANS Conference, Geoscience and Remote Sensing International Symposium (IGARSS), Wormley Conference, American Geophysical Union Conference (AGU),  International Association for Physical Sciences of the Ocean, International Union of Geodesy and Geophysics.

Glazman conducted exploratory expeditions in the Bering Sea and the North Pacific Ocean off the coast of Kamchatka and Japan, the Arctic, as well as the Barents Sea off the coast of Finland.  He took measurements of the depths and salinity of oceans, of the wind forces, pressures and surface temperatures, by experimentation equipped with vessel technology available in the 1970s.

The topics in which Glazman made contributions include wave dynamics, capillary- and inertia-gravity waves, nonlinear waves and turbulence, Rossby waves, sea level measurements, sea surface geometry, magnetic field at sea surface, wind generated wave dynamics, adsorbed film and oscillations.

Selected publications

References

External links
Roman Glazman Oceanography website

1948 births
2006 deaths
American oceanographers
Soviet emigrants to the United States
NASA people
University of Rhode Island alumni